Cristina Quintarelli (born 24 August 1963) is an Italian swimmer. She competed in the women's 100 metre butterfly at the 1984 Summer Olympics.

References

External links
 

1963 births
Living people
Italian female butterfly swimmers
Olympic swimmers of Italy
Swimmers at the 1984 Summer Olympics
Place of birth missing (living people)
Swimmers at the 1979 Mediterranean Games